The Lloyd Spriggle Memorial Bridge is a steel girder bridge with a concrete deck, crossing the Wisconsin Channel of the Mississippi River, which is the secondary channel at this point. The bridge carries U.S. Route 63 (US 63), connecting to the Eisenhower Bridge, which crosses the Minnesota Channel (Main Channel) of the Mississippi River at Red Wing, Minnesota. The bridge was named for Lloyd Spriggle, a longtime local leader who worked for environmental protection, including protections of local lakes, rivers, and streams.

References

External links 
 Lloyd Spriggle Memorial Bridge

Bridges over the Mississippi River
Bridges of the United States Numbered Highway System
Road bridges in Wisconsin
U.S. Route 63
Bridges completed in 1960
Interstate vehicle bridges in the United States